Shivers is a surname. Notable people with the surname include:

Allan Shivers (1907–1985), Texas politician
Chris Shivers (born 1978), top-rated bull rider
Coyote Shivers (born 1965), musician and actor
Jason Shivers (born 1982), defensive back in the Canadian Football League
 John Shivers (Medal of Honor) (1830–?), U.S. Marine and Medal of Honor recipient
 John Shivers (sound designer), American theatrical sound designer
 John D. Shivers Jr., member of the Ohio House of Representatives
Joseph Shivers, American chemist who lived in West Chester, Pennsylvania
Louise Shivers, author and writer-in-residence at Augusta State University, Augusta, Georgia
Olin Shivers, creator of the Scheme shell scsh.
Roy Shivers (born 1941), the General Manager of the Saskatchewan Roughriders of the Canadian Football League
Wes Shivers (born 1977), American professional mixed martial arts (MMA) fighter

See also
Shivers (disambiguation)